Marian Stoleru (born 20 November 1988, Chișinău, Moldavian SSR) is a Moldavian football midfielder who plays for German club SV Pars Neu-Isenburg.

Club statistics
Total matches played in Moldavian First League: 63 matches - 8 goals

References

External links

Profile at Divizia Nationala
Marian Stoleru at FuPa

1988 births
Footballers from Chișinău
Moldovan footballers
Moldovan expatriate footballers
Living people
Association football midfielders
FC Dacia Chișinău players
FC Milsami Orhei players
Expatriate footballers in Germany
Moldovan expatriate sportspeople in Germany